Emmalocera umbrivittella is a species of snout moth in the genus Emmalocera. It was described by Ragonot in 1888. It is found in India.

References

Moths described in 1888
Emmalocera